Rathmannsdorf is a township in the Saxon district of Sächsische Schweiz-Osterzgebirge.  Rathmannsdorf is  down the Elbe from Bad Schandau.

Geography
The township's highest point is a plateau near Bad Schandau 200 meters above sea level, with the lowest point 120 meters above sea level along the Elbe. The township consists of the districts Wendischfähre, Höhe, Zauke, Plan and Gluto.

History
Rathmannsdorf was first mentioned in a document in 1443.  Rathmannsdorf along with Bad Schandau, Porschdorf, and Reinhardtsdorf-Schöna form a Verwaltungsgemeinschaft.  The town is also a stop on the Sebnitztalbahn part of the Sächsische Semmering-Bahn, a local railroad.

References 

Populated places in Saxon Switzerland